Harrison Township is one of the twelve townships of Paulding County, Ohio, United States.  The 2000 census found 1,566 people in the township, 741 of whom lived in the unincorporated portions of the township.

Geography
Located in the western part of the county along the Indiana line, it borders the following townships:
Carryall Township - north
Crane Township - northeast corner
Paulding Township - east
Blue Creek Township - southeast corner
Benton Township - south
Jackson Township, Allen County, Indiana - southwest
Maumee Township, Allen County, Indiana - west

Part of the village of Payne is located in southern Harrison Township on the border with Benton Township.

Name and history
It is one of nineteen Harrison Townships statewide.

Government
The township is governed by a three-member board of trustees, who are elected in November of odd-numbered years to a four-year term beginning on the following January 1. Two are elected in the year after the presidential election and one is elected in the year before it. There is also an elected township fiscal officer, who serves a four-year term beginning on April 1 of the year after the election, which is held in November of the year before the presidential election. Vacancies in the fiscal officership or on the board of trustees are filled by the remaining trustees.

References

External links
County website

Townships in Paulding County, Ohio
Townships in Ohio